Joseph Moerenhout (10 March 1910 – 27 March 1966) was a Belgian racing cyclist. He rode in the 1933 Tour de France.

References

1910 births
1966 deaths
Belgian male cyclists
Place of birth missing